The 1912 All-Ireland Junior Hurling Championship was the first staging of the All-Ireland Junior Championship, the Gaelic Athletic Association's second tier Gaelic football championship.

The All-Ireland final was played on 23 February 1913 at Jones's Road in Dublin, between Tipperary and Louth, in what was their first ever championship meeting. Tipperary won the match by 1–04 to 1–03 to claim their first championship title.

Results

All-Ireland Junior Football Championship

All-Ireland final

References

Junior
All-Ireland Junior Football Championship